Altınay is a Turkish surname. Notable people with the surname include:

Ahmet Refik Altınay (1881–1937), Turkish historian, writer, and poet
Ayşe Gül Altınay (born 1971), Turkish anthropologist
Koray Altınay (born 1991), Turkish football defender 
Lucas Altinay (born 2002), British-Turkish Electrical Engineer and winner of BSA19/11 Standards Award

Turkish-language surnames